Jason Kandybowicz (born 1978) is an American linguist, since 2022 Full Professor of Linguistics at The Graduate Center, CUNY He received his Ph.D. from UCLA in 2006 as an advisee of Hilda Koopman. Kandybowicz has researched several endangered and understudied West African languages, including Nupe, Krachi, Ikpana and Asante Twi. Working within the generative grammar framework, he has written several important books  and scientific journal articles about Niger-Congo languages and the syntax-phonology interface. He has made a number of media appearances, including interviews for podcasts and the British Broadcasting Company

Selected bibliography

Books
 (2023) Ikpana Interrogatives (with Bertille Baron, Philip T. Duncan, and Hironori Katsuda)
 (2020) Anti-contiguity: A Theory of Wh- Prosody
 (2018) African Linguistics on the Prairie (with Travis Major, Philip T. Duncan, and Harold Torrence)
 (2017) Africa's Endangered Languages: Documentary and Theoretical Approaches (with Harold Torrence)
 (2008) The Grammar of Repetition: Nupe Grammar at the Syntax-Phonology Interface

Articles
(2017) On Prosodic Variation and the Distribution of Wh- In-situ. Linguistic Variation 17: 111–148.   
(2015) Wh- Question Formation in Krachi (with Harold Torrence). Journal of African Languages and Linguistics 36: 253–286.   
(2015) On Prosodic Vacuity and Verbal Resumption in Asante Twi. Linguistic Inquiry 46: 243–272. 
(2013) Ways of Emphatic Scope Taking: from Emphatic Assertion in Nupe to the Grammar of Emphasis. Lingua 128: 51–71.  
(2009) Embracing Edges: Syntactic and Phono-syntactic Edge Sensitivity in Nupe. Natural Language and Linguistic Theory 27: 305–344. 
(2007) On Fusion and Multiple Copy Spell-Out: The Case of Verbal Repetition. In Norbert Corver and Jairo Nunes (eds.) The Copy Theory of Movement, pp. 119–150. John Benjamins Publishing Company. 
(2008) Externalization and Emergence: On the Status of Parameters in the Minimalist Program. Biolinguistics 3: 94–99. 
(2003) On Directionality and the Structure of the Verb Phrase: Evidence from Nupe (with Mark C. Baker). Syntax 6: 115–155.

References

External links
Scientist podcast interview
BBC World Service interview
Scientists of New York interview
Works by Jason Kandybowicz in libraries (WorldCat catalog)
Jason Kandybowicz's website

Living people
1978 births
Rutgers University alumni
City University of New York faculty
University of Texas faculty
Linguists from the United States
University of California, Los Angeles alumni
University of Kansas faculty
Swarthmore College faculty
Syntacticians